"Nine Lives" is a song by American hard rock band Aerosmith.  It was released in 1997 as the lead single and title track from the album Nine Lives.  The song was written by lead singer Steven Tyler, guitarist Joe Perry, and songwriter Marti Frederiksen.

The song starts with Tyler imitating a cat's wail.

Chart position
"Nine Lives" was released as a promotional single to rock radio and peaked at #37 on the Mainstream Rock Tracks chart in 1997.

In concert
On the band's lengthy Nine Lives Tour from 1997–1999, "Nine Lives" was almost always the opener. The band also performed the song on a few television appearances, including one on Saturday Night Live.

In other media
"Nine Lives" is one of the two theme songs performed by Aerosmith used in the video game Dead or Alive 3 for the Xbox created by Team Ninja. It is played during the intro.

The song also plays on Rock 'n' Roller Coaster Starring Aerosmith at Disney's Hollywood Studios at Walt Disney World. It is exclusive to the "Limousine" (ride vehicle) with a license plate that reads "1QKLIMO".

References

Aerosmith songs
1997 singles
Songs written by Steven Tyler
Songs written by Joe Perry (musician)
Songs written by Marti Frederiksen
Columbia Records singles
Song recordings produced by Kevin Shirley